Kamesznica  is a village in the administrative district of Gmina Milówka, within Żywiec County, Silesian Voivodeship, in southern Poland.

The village has a population of 2,806. The village was established in the 17th century.

References

Kamesznica